Fútbol Club Cartagena B is the reserve team of FC Cartagena, a Spanish football team based in Cartagena, in the autonomous community of Murcia. Founded in 2015, it currently plays in Segunda Federación – Group 4, holding home games at Estadio Ciudad Jardín.

History
In July 2015, Cartagena B was created as FC Cartagena's second reserve team, the first being CD Algar. It took the place of dissolved Soho-Medi CF in the Primera Autonómica, achieving immediate promotion as second.

In 2016, the club became Cartagena's first reserve team after the agreement with Algar was not renewed. Another promotion followed (now to Tercera División), after CF Lorca Deportiva assured their promotion to Segunda División B.

Season to season

1 season in Segunda Federación
4 seasons in Tercera División
1 season in Tercera División RFEF

Current squad

From Youth Academy

Out on loan

Managers
Víctor Basadre (2015–2017)
Juan Lillo (2017–2018)
David Bascuñana (2018–2020)
Pepe Aguilar (2020–)

See also
FC Cartagena-La Unión
Cartagena FC

References

External links
Official website 
Futbolme team profile 
Peña Goto Cartago, fansite 

Football clubs in the Region of Murcia
Association football clubs established in 2015
 
Spanish reserve football teams
2015 establishments in Murcia (region)
Sport in Cartagena, Spain